Adamystidae is a family of mites in the order Trombidiformes. There are at least three genera, one of which is extinct, in Adamystidae. It is the sole family in the monotypic superfamily Adamystoidea.

Genera
These three genera belong to the family Adamystidae:
 Adamystis Cunliffe, 1957
 Nannodromus Fernandez, Coineau, Theron & Tiedt, 2014
 † Saxidromus Coineau, 1974

References

Further reading

 
 
 

Trombidiformes
Acari families